Ingeborg Viola Öllegård Wellton-Hell (née Wellton; 18 April 1932 – 26 June 1991) was a Swedish actress. She was married to actor Erik Hell from 1960 until his death in 1973.

She studied at the Royal Dramatic Training Academy from 1950–53 and was engaged at the Royal Dramatic Theatre until 1956. After 1956 she was engaged at many theatres, among them Östgötateatern and Riksteatern. As film actor she is well known as Tommy's and Annika's mother in Pippi Longstocking.

Selected filmography
 Hammarforsens brus (1948)
 Folket i fält (1953)
 A Night in the Archipelago (1953)
Unmarried Mothers
 The Mistress (1962)
 I Am Curious (Yellow) (1967)
 Pippi Longstocking (1969–1973, TV and film)
 August Strindberg: ett liv (1985, TV)

External links
Öllegård Wellton on Internet Movie Database
Öllegård Wellton on Swedish Film Database

1932 births
1991 deaths
Actresses from Stockholm
20th-century Swedish actresses
Place of death missing